Charles Esten Puskar III (born September 9, 1965), also known professionally as Charles Esten, and Chip Esten, is an American actor, musician and comedian.

Esten played the role of country singer Deacon Claybourne on the ABC/CMT drama Nashville from 2012 to 2018, which subsequently kickstarted his own musical career.  He also played Ward Cameron on the Netflix teen drama series Outer Banks. He appeared in the improvisation show  Whose Line Is It Anyway? as a series regular between 1999–2005 and returned in 2019 as a regular.

Early life
Esten was born in Pittsburgh, Pennsylvania and moved to Alexandria, Virginia at age nine, after his parents divorced. He and his younger sister were raised by their mother.

His late father, Charles, was a prominent local businessman and business partner of former Pittsburgh Steelers center Ray Mansfield.

Esten is a 1983 graduate of Alexandria's T.C. Williams High School, where he played football for the Titans a decade after the events of the film Remember the Titans. He has noted in several interviews that his Nashville costar Hayden Panettiere appeared in the film as the daughter of his real-life coach. He then attended his parents' and sister's alma mater, the College of William and Mary, where he was a member of Theta Delta Chi fraternity and graduated with a degree in economics in 1987. At William and Mary, he was the lead vocalist in the local band "N'est Pas" from 1985–88. Following graduation, Esten moved to the United Kingdom to make his theatrical debut, playing the title role in the musical Buddy in the early 1990s.

Esten's first television appearance was in December 1988 as a contestant on the NBC game show Sale of the Century (under the name Chip Puskar). He won over $32,000 in cash and prizes in five episodes (December 13-19); he later sold his prizes.

Career

Whose Line Is It Anyway?

In 1992, Esten made his debut on Whose Line Is It Anyway? in the fourth series and "won" the episode. He subsequently appeared in more episodes later the same year when the show did a run in New York City. At the time, the show needed a second specialist improvisational singer to fill in for Mike McShane.

Esten made his final appearance in the UK edition in 1994 before moving back to the US. Although appearing on stage and screen thereafter, his 1999 return to Whose Line Is It Anyway? — in the show's American format with Drew Carey as host — established him as a regular "fourth contestant" on the show. Due to his singing abilities, he was often paired with series regular Wayne Brady on musical games. Although he did not return as a regular when the show was revived in 2013 and only appeared as a special guest during the 13th and 14th seasons (as he was one of the main cast members of Nashville), he eventually returned as a fourth seater in season 15.

Other comedy work
Following his return to Whose Line Is It Anyway, Esten made a guest appearance as himself with fellow regular cast members from the show Wayne Brady, Greg Proops and Brad Sherwood on The Drew Carey Show. In 2003, he hosted a semi-scripted semi-improvised comedy mini series called On the Spot. Between 2004–06, he was a member of the touring group Improv All-Stars and recurring cast member on Drew Carey's Green Screen Show.

In 2011, he was a regular on Drew Carey's Improv-A-Ganza on GSN. Esten and fellow former Whose Line Is It Anyway stars Greg Proops, Ryan Stiles and Jeff Davis regularly teamed up and tour around the country doing live improv under the name Whose Live Anyway?. In April 2014, Esten ceased work with Whose Live Anyway? due to his role in Nashville, and was replaced by Joel Murray.

Film appearances

In 2001, Esten appeared in Billy Crystal's TV movie 61* as Kevin Maris, the son of legendary New York Yankees slugger Roger Maris. He had small roles in three Kevin Costner movies, The Postman, Thirteen Days as downed U-2 pilot Major Rudolf Anderson, and Swing Vote.

Esten also starred in a public service video, Riding Straight, produced for the Motorcycle Safety Foundation's curriculum, Motorcycle Rider Course: Riding and Street Skills (MRC:RSS), in which he portrayed a surfer dude, a snuff-dipping hick, and a concerned friend in a bar.

Television
Esten has appeared as a guest star in various TV series, including Married... with Children, The New Adventures of Old Christine, Star Trek: The Next Generation, Star Trek: Voyager, ER, NCIS: Los Angeles, Jessie, The Mentalist, and The Office.

From 2012 to 2018 he was part of the main cast of Nashville, starring as Deacon Claybourne. He has also contributed to the soundtracks as both a singer and songwriter. He co-wrote "I Know How to Love You Now" with Deana Carter, which was featured in the season 3 premiere.
Starting in 2020, he was one of the stars of a very popular Netflix series, Outerbanks, playing the main villain (Ward Cameron).  

In 2013, Esten appeared as a celebrity contestant on Who Wants to Be a Millionaire and won $500,000 for his charity.

In 2017, Esten was cast in a series of television and radio advertisements as Carl Hardee Sr., the fictional founder of the Carl's Jr. and Hardee's fast food chains.

On July 9, 2018, it was announced that Esten was cast in a recurring role in the TNT thriller Tell Me Your Secrets. According to TVLine, "The drama follows three characters with equally disturbing backstories: Emma (played by American Horror Story‘s Lily Rabe) once faced down a dangerous killer, John (Legion‘s Hamish Linklater) is a former serial predator in search of redemption, and Mary (Private Practice‘s Amy Brenneman) is a grieving mother determined to find her missing daughter. Per the synopsis, 'As each of them is pushed to the edge, the truth about their pasts and motives grows ever murkier, blurring the lines between victim and perpetrator.'"

Music
July 25, 2018, Esten was awarded the Guinness World Records title of "The most consecutive weeks to release an original digital single by a music act". He was presented with the certificate following a performance of his single, Halfway Home, on NBC's Today. His #EverySingleFriday project was announced via his Twitter page July 1, 2016 and ran from July 15th of that year through July 21, 2017. Over the course of 54 weeks Esten delivered a new single each Friday, which he himself wrote or co-wrote. Artists featured throughout the project include Ashley Campbell, Colin Linden, Steve Mandile of Sixwire, Sarah Siskind, Karla Davis, and Miss Jackie Wilson.

Esten is a frequent performer on the Grand Ole Opry. His 100th performance was celebrated with his appearance on the program on July 20, 2018. On February 4, 2023, Esten filled in as host of the Saturday live performance segment of the Grand Ole Opry - his first appearance in that role.

On May 15, 2019, it was announced that Esten had signed with APA's concert division for music representation.  He continues to tour across the U.S. and Europe, performing his original music. 

In 2023, Esten announced the release of "One Good Move", the debut single from his upcoming debut studio album, set for independent release later in the year.

Personal life
Esten is married to Patty Puskar (née Hanson), whom he met in college. They have three children. The family moved to Nashville after Esten was cast as a series regular on Nashville.

Esten is national chairman for the annual Light the Night Walks, a fundraiser benefiting The Leukemia & Lymphoma Society (LLS). His daughter is a leukemia survivor.

Filmography

Films

Television

Discography

Singles

ADid not enter the Hot 100 but charted on Bubbling Under Hot 100 Singles.

References

External links

 Whose Live Anyway? live improv comedy show starring Ryan Stiles, Greg Proops, Chip Esten and Jeff Davis touring North America

1965 births
Male actors from Pittsburgh
American male comedians
21st-century American comedians
American male film actors
American male singers
American male television actors
American expatriates in the United Kingdom
College of William & Mary alumni
Contestants on American game shows
Living people
Singers from Pennsylvania
20th-century American male actors
21st-century American male actors
T. C. Williams High School alumni